Shervin Haji Aghapour (born 30 March 1997) is an Iranian singer-songwriter. Born in Babol, he began posting covers to his social media in late 2018. After auditioning in New Era on 22 March 2019 with "Maybe Paradise" which he wrote, he released the song as his debut single on all platforms and gained recognition among the younger Iranian generation. Hajipour rose to fame after the release of his single "Baraye" which has been described as "the anthem" of the Mahsa Amini protests. In 2023, he won the first Grammy Award for Best Song for Social Change at the 65th Annual Grammy Awards for "Baraye".
Hajipour was arrested on September 29, 2022, two days after "Baraye" was initially published, and was released on bail on October 4, 2022.

Early life 
Shervin Haji Aghapour was born on March 30, 1997, in Babolsar, Mazandaran. He graduated with a bachelor's degree in economy from University of Mazandaran. He took up music at the age of eight when he entered a violin class and graduated from several musical classes later. Then in secondary school, he started to compose professionally. When at university, he was composing music for theatre performances and editing. Only later he began to sing himself.

Career 
At the age of 22, Hajipour participated in the New Era TV Talent show competition (produced by Ehsan Alikhani), where he advanced to the finals of the second round of its first season, Later, the artistic director of the program announced that Iran Broadcasting was worried that he would cause trouble later.
During the Mahsa Amini protests in Iran, sparked by the death of Iranian-Kurdish woman Mahsa Amini, Hajipour published his new song "Baraye..."  (For...; Because of...) in which he used protest tweets starting with the word Baraye..., written in support of the protests. He managed to express the wishes and grievances of Iranians in this song.
It was seen more than 40 million times in less than two days on his Instagram page only. The main theme of the song is support of women with the slogan "Woman, Life, Freedom".

Discography 

Hajipour has released thirty-three songs, three soundtrack songs, four music videos, thirty-one unreleased songs and three songs as featured artist.

Arrest 
On 29 September 2022 Hajipour was arrested for the song "Baraye". He was forced to remove the song from his social media platforms by the Islamic Revolutionary Guard Corps's security agents shortly after his arrest. Tasnim News Agency, affiliated to the Islamic Revolutionary Guard Corps, posted an edited version of the video clip, with images showing the Islamic republic's achievements instead of the original ones.

On 4 October 2022, Hajipour was released on bail "so that his case can go through the legal process," according to Mohammad Karimi, prosecutor of the northern province of Mazandaran. Hajipour then posted on Instagram that the song was regrettably being used by political groups outside Iran; activists believe this statement may have been coerced.

During Hajipour's arrest many social media users were taking steps to nominate his "Baraye" song to the National Academy of Recording Arts and Sciences for the Grammy Awards category "Best Song For Social Change", which is a new category.
Shervin Hajipour received the Special Merit Award for Best Song For Social Change for "Baraye" at the 2023 GRAMMYs. This new Special Merit Award was presented by First Lady Jill Biden, who highlighted the message of the Iranian singer/songwriter.

Reactions to arrest
 Roger Waters wrote in a tweet: "Hey Ayatollah, leave the children alone!" referring to the song "Hey Ayatollah Leave Those Kids Alone" from 2010 by the British rock band Blurred Vision, which was inspired by the famous Pink Floyd song "Another Brick in the Wall" (1979)."
 Murat Boz published the video of the song "For..." by Shervin on his Instagram page and wrote in the caption: "It is said that Shervin was arrested for writing a song about the freedom of the people of Iran. unbelievable. "I hope that nothing bad will happen to my colleague during his detention and that he will be released immediately."
 Mohammad Esfahani the singer of pop and traditional music mentioned Shervin as in response to this arrest on his Instagram, mentioned Shervin as his friend and student whom he met in the New Age competitions and said, "Shervin is an incredibly talented, innocent, shy and emotional young man. and I was very affected and saddened by the news of his arrest."
 Karim Sadjadpour, an Iranian-American policy analyst at the Carnegie Endowment said: "No matter what happens to the protests it's worth noting the most viral song in Iran's history, likely to be remembered for decades to come, isn't about resistance to America or Israel or anywhere else. It's a song about Iranian dreams for a normal life."

Awards and nominations

Legacy of "Baraye" 
As of February 2023, "Baraye" has been performed by many Iranian and non-Iranian artists, singers and dancers alike, outside of Iran in the original Persian and in translations. Some renditions in alphabetical order follow below.

Covers 

 Amanda Tüz and Avîn Awat; in Spanish and Persian
 Azam Ali & Loga Ramin Torkian together with Hamed Nikpay, Mamak Khadem, Arash Avin, Mahsa Ghassemi; in Persian
 Ben Salomon; in German; Ben Salomon used his own text entitled "Ich träume" (I am dreaming) to Hajipour's music 
 Carola; in Swedish
 Elena Marco; in German
 Erwin (Karmandan); mix overlayed on Hajipour's song
 Golshifteh Farahani at the invitation of Coldplay; in Persian; at a concert in Buenos Aires, Argentina, end of Oct. 2022
 Lisa Wahlandt & Martin Kälberer; in German
 Maîtrise Chalonnaise Saint Charles, a French children and youths choirs; in Persian, 2 Nov. 2022
 Manuela Dumfart; in Persian; opera version 
 Pegah Moshir Pour, Drusilla Foer in Italian; at the Sanremo Music Festival, 9 Feb. 2023, the song is recited with explicatory passages
 Rana Mansour; in English; also at the final of "The Voice of Germany" competition
 Shelley Segal; in English, 2022
 Sogand, Iranian singer; in Persian, performed in Cologne, Nov. 2022

Dance and pantomime 

 a group of artistic activists in Sydney with the participation of Mariam, Razi, Saideh, Mahsa, Romina, Linda with the co-operation with Amir Karami and Behzad Montazeri street art, pantomime performance
 Dance Company 058; pantomime dance by a Dutch dance company
 Ensemble Shiraz; dance performance with famous clips from the protests in Iran, 2022
 Navak Dance Ensemble; dance performance

References

External links 
 Shervin Hajipour's YT channel
 Programme on Hajipour at Radio Farda YT channel (fa.)

Living people
Iranian women's rights activists
Persian-language singers
Grammy_Award_winners
People from Babolsar
Mahsa Amini protests
1997 births
Iranian singer-songwriters